Ramón Olalquiaga Borne (30 August 1898 in Gipuzkoa – 31 January 1990 in Madrid), sometimes spelled as Ramón Olalkiaga, was a Spanish footballer who played as a forward for Athletic Madrid, and later a coach, engineer and professor of agronomy.

Club career
Born in Gipuzkoa to a local veterinarian, he studied Marianist studies in San Sebastián and later studied agronomic engineering in Madrid. As a student in Madrid, he played for Atlético Madrid for 6 seasons. Together with Sansinenea, Miguel Mieg, Cosme Vázquez and Monchín Triana, Mieg was part of the great Athletic side of the early 20s that won the 1920–21 Centro Championship, the club's first-ever piece of silverware, and then reached the 1921 Copa del Rey Final, where they were beaten 1–4 by Athletic Bilbao. He played his entire career at Atlético Madrid, thus being part of the so-called one-club men group.

International career
Being an Athletic Madrid player, he was eligible to play for the 'Centro' (Madrid area) representative team], and in May 1918, he was a member of the team that won the Prince of Asturias Cup in 1918, an inter-regional competition organized by the RFEF. In the tournament, he only played the second leg of the decisive tie against Cantabric, and in his only appearance in the competition he managed to imprint his name in the competition's history by netting the two goals that sealed a 3–1 victory that sealed Madrid's second title in a row. With these two goals, he was the top scorer of the tournament alongside Senén Villaverde and fellow teammate José María Sansinenea.

Managerial career
As a coach, he managed Athletic Madrid for one season, 1924–25, leading his side to victory in the 1924–25 central championship, hence qualifying to the 1925 Copa del Rey, where they were eliminated in the semi-finals by Arenas Club. But, nevertheless, science prevailed over football and Olalquiaga dedicated the later years of his life to agronomy teaching agronomy in Madrid for many years. He became the author of many scientific works. Ramón Olalquiaga received an Order of Merit in the field of agriculture, fisheries and food.

Honours

Club
Athletic Madrid
Centro Championship:
Champions (1): 1920–21

Copa del Rey:
Runner-up (1): 1921

International
Madrid XI
Prince of Asturias Cup:
Champions (1): 1918

References

1898 births
1990 deaths
People from Urola Kosta
Sportspeople from Gipuzkoa
Footballers from the Basque Country (autonomous community)
Spanish footballers
Atlético Madrid footballers
Spanish football managers
Atlético Madrid managers